Two ships of United States Navy have been named USS Edsall:

 , the lead ship of her class of destroyer escort, in commission from 1943 to 1946

United States Navy ship names